Golgin subfamily A member 2 is a protein that in humans is encoded by the GOLGA2 gene.

Function 

The Golgi apparatus, which participates in glycosylation and transport of proteins and lipids in the secretory pathway, consists of a series of stacked cisternae (flattened membrane sacs). Interactions between the Golgi and microtubules are thought to be important for the reorganization of the Golgi after it fragments during mitosis. The golgins are a family of proteins, of which the protein encoded by this gene is a member, that are localized to the Golgi. This encoded protein has been postulated to play roles in the stacking of Golgi cisternae and in vesicular transport. Several alternatively spliced transcript variants of this gene have been described, but the full-length nature of these variants has not been determined.

A patient with a neuromuscular disorder has been identified that is homozygous for a deletion mutation in this gene, and morpholino knockdown in zebrafish has shown similar phenotypes.

Interactions 

GOLGA2 has been shown to interact with:

 GORASP1,
 GORASP2, 
 RAB1A, 
 RAB1B  and
 RAB2A. 
 WAC protein

References

Further reading